Ismail Mohammed Sharif (born 19 January 1962) is an Iraqi football midfielder who played for Iraq in the 1986 FIFA World Cup. He also played for Al-Shorta SC and Al-Shabab.

Career statistics

International goals
Scores and results list Iraq's goal tally first.

References

External links
FIFA profile

1962 births
Iraqi footballers
Iraq international footballers
Association football midfielders
1986 FIFA World Cup players
Al-Shorta SC players
Living people
Olympic footballers of Iraq
Footballers at the 1988 Summer Olympics